Lists of American television episodes with LGBT themes are organized by period and contain articles about episodes on television in the United States with lesbian, gay, bisexual, or transgender themes.
They include:

 List of pre–Stonewall riots American television episodes with LGBT themes
 List of 1970s American television episodes with LGBT themes
 List of 1980s American television episodes with LGBT themes
 List of 1990s American television episodes with LGBT themes

See also

Straightwashing

American
LGBT themes
LGBT themes in fiction